Molla Piri (also Romanized as Mollā Pīrī; also known as Mollā Parī and Mullah Pīri) is a village in Saidabad Rural District, in the Central District of Ijrud County, Zanjan Province, Iran. At the 2006 census, its population was 1,107, in 281 families.

References 

Populated places in Ijrud County